Time Without Consequence is the debut studio album by British singer-songwriter Alexi Murdoch. It was released on 6 June 2006 by Zero Summer. The album features re-recorded songs "Song for You", "Blue Mind", and "Orange Sky" from Murdoch's Four Songs EP.

Songs used in media
The songs "Orange Sky" (S1 E5 - "English, Fitz or Percy") and "Home" (S2 E16 – "Chicago") have both featured in the Fox television series Prison Break.

"All My Days" was featured during the closing moments of "The Cold Turkey", the third episode of the fourth, and final, season of The O.C.. "Orange Sky" was featured on The O.C.'''s first soundtrack, Music from the OC: Mix 1. "All My Days"  was featured in the Syfy series Stargate Universe, in episode 13, "Faith". The song was featured in the film Away We Go, which Murdoch also provided the soundtrack for, and was the title song in Real Steel. It played over the ending of season 1 episode 11 of Selfie. It was also featured in the Sprint Girl commercial for the Samsung Galaxy S III Unlimited Edition by Sprint Nextel.

"Breathe" was featured in a 2008 commercial for the Nissan Titan. "Breathe" was also featured on the show Stargate Universe, in the episode "Air, Part 3" and in Continuum'' third season episode "Minute Changes".

Track listing

Personnel
 Jim Keltner - drums
 Greg Leisz - guitar, pedal steel guitar
 Pete Thomas - tom tom
 Jay Bellerose - drums, tambourine, percussion
 Alexi Murdoch - vocals, guitar, slide guitar, piano, harmonium, organ, keyboards, snare drum, cymbals, tambourine
 Zac Rae - keyboards, vibraphone
 Joel Shearer - guitar, shaker, background vocals
 Deron Johnson - Fender Rhodes piano
 Ben Peeler - lap steel guitar
 Marvin Etzioni - mandolin
 James SK Wān - bamboo flute
 Sophie Barker - background vocals
 Brett Simons - double bass, electric bass
 Oliver Kraus - cello
 Al Sgro - drums, background vocals
 Jason McKenzie - tabla
 Ramy Antoun - drums

References

External links
Alexi Murdoch

2006 albums
Alexi Murdoch albums